Koszutka is a district of Katowice. It has an area of 1.38 km2 and in 2007 had 12,431 inhabitants.

References

Districts of Katowice